Hamsa Gita (Sanskrit) (also referred to as Uddhava Gita) consists of Krishna's final discourse to Uddhava before Krishna draws his worldly 'descent' (Sanskrit: avatar) and 'pastimes' (Sanskrit: lila) to completion. Though the Uddhava Gita is often published singularly as a stand-alone work, it is also evident in the Eleventh Canto of the Bhagavata Purana commencing from verse 40 section 6 through to the end of section 29, comprising more than 1000 'verses' (Sanskrit: shloka) and is considered part of the Purana literature proper. This discourse importantly contains the story of an Avadhuta and though it does not state explicitly the name of this personage within the section or the Bhagavata Purana as a whole, Vaishnava tradition and the greater Sanatana Dharma auspice ascribe this agency to Dattatreya.

Manuscripts and textual notes
The names Uddhava Gita and Hamsa Gita are popularly interchangeable but Hamsa Gita also specifically denotes  (xi. 13- 16) a subset of the Uddhava Gita and the Bhagavata Purana proper.

Nomenclature, orthography and etymology
Hamsa Gita (Sanskrit) (also referred to as Uddhava Gita) where the hamsa is a metaphor for the Paramahamsa as well as a natural teacher of grace evident in nature. The hamsa (हंस, in Sanskrit and often written hansa) is a swan, often considered to be the mute swan (Cygnus olor). It is used in Indian culture as a symbol and a decorative element. The term 'gītā' (literally "song" in Sanskrit; Devanagari: गीता).
The swan is metaphorical representation of one's discriminative capabilities referring to the swan's ability to sieve out its nourishment from the composite material around.

English discourse
Tigunait (2002: pp. 39–45) render the narrative of the 24 teachers of Dattatreya in the Uddhava Gita into English.
Though the consensus of scholars hold the Bhagavata Purana  to be a composite work of the oral tradition of many mouths, the Vaishnava tradition as well as the Bhagavata Purana itself uphold that it was scribed by Vyasadeva. That said, the narrator of the Hamsa Gita is the sage Shuka, son of Vyasadeva. It is important to note that even if the work is composite, that it  "...does not show the lack of cohesion or compactness that must mark the work handled by many writers..." says Upadhyaya in the Foreword to Brown & Saraswati (2000: p. 8) and then Upadhyaya moreover opines that whosoever the poet of the Hamsa Gita and the Bhagavata Purana may be that "[h]ere is a poet who uses pattern and metaphor in a complex craftsmanship to create a ritual of celebration."
Haigh (2007: p. 127) in his opening paragraph to his work on the Uddhava Gita frames its import as a model of environmental education:
Sri Dattatreya, who Lord Krishna quotes in The Uddhava Gita, has been evoked as a guru for environmental education. Sri Dattatreya gained enlightenment by observing the world, which provided Him with 24 instructors. These taught Him the futility of mundane attachments, the benefits of contemplation and forebearance [sic], and a path towards the spiritual self-realization of the Supreme. Sri Dattatreya, an incarnation of Trimurti, features in several Puranas where His teachings involve direct challenges to the pretensions and prejudices of the learner. His core message is "never judge by surface appearances but always seek a deeper Truth": the Earth is sacred, an aspect of God, and a puzzle that challenges the spiritual self to awaken to its true nature.

Paramahamsa (2008: unpaginated) arrays a suite of Gita literature enshrined and subsumed within the auspice of the Srimad Bhagavata and holds that they are all songs of Monism:
"The Gitas that find place in Srimad Bhagavata such as the Uddhava-Gita, the Rudra-Gita, the Bhikshu-Gita, the Sruti-Gita, the Hamsa-Gita propound Monism as the essence of their philosophy."

English renderings

Upadhyaya, in the Foreword to Brown & Saraswati (2000: p. 8) holds that Saraswati (that is Ambikananda) who herself is a sannyasin and took this ashrama from a very young age, writes thus:
Swami Ambikananda's success in rendering the work into metrical composition is a tribute to the versatility of Sanskrit and the lucidity of the original writing. The method of her translation is marked by two considerati ons. She has sought to find close equivalents, keeping in view both the formal and dynamic aspects of the language; and her interpretative translation aims at complete naturalness of expression, pointing the reader to the modes of behaviour within the context of his or her own culture.

Sarasvati in Brown and Sarasvati (2000: p. 14) holds that it was both Venkatesananda (1921 - 1982) and his guruji Sivananda (1887 - 1963) that opened her heart to this work:
It was Swami Sivananda and Swami Venkatesananda who opened my heart to this sacred text, and their teaching that enabled me to undertake this translation, which attempts to convey its message to all spiritual seekers.

Primary resources

Sanskrit
Uddhava Gita @ Wikisource in Devanagari Unicode
 Hamsa Gita @ Wikisource in Devanagari Unicode

English
The Uddhava Gita by International Gita Society - PDF version

Notes

References
Haigh, Martin (2007). 'Sri Dattatreya's 24 Gurus: Learning from the World in Hindu Tradition'. Canadian Journal of Environmental Education; volume 12, number 1, 2007: pp. 127–142. Source:  (accessed: Monday March 8, 2010)
Paramahamsa, K. R. (2008). Ekam SAT 5. TotalRecall Publications, Incorporated. , 9781590958735 Source:  (accessed: Monday March 8, 2010)

External cites

 Read the Uddhava Gita English translation.

Hindu texts
Sanskrit texts
Krishna